Samuel David Moore (born October 12, 1935) is an American vocalist who was a member of the soul and R&B group, Sam & Dave, from 1961 to 1981. He is a member of the Rock & Roll Hall of Fame, the Grammy Hall of Fame (for "Soul Man"), and the Vocal Group Hall of Fame.

Overview
Moore is best known for his work as Sam of the soul music duo Sam & Dave, where he was the higher tenor voice. Moore has performed in concerts, ranging from the Atlantic Records 40th anniversary party in 1988, to the New Orleans Jazz Festival and the SXSW Music Industry conference in 2006. Moore has also performed in various venues ranging from the tribute for Elvis Presley in 1994, to the Grammy Awards 2006 tribute to Wilson Pickett, and the Kennedy Center Honors in 2006 for Smokey Robinson. Moore has also partnered with other famous recording artists, including Conway Twitty, Bruce Springsteen, Don Henley, Elton John, Phil Collins, Lou Reed, Mariah Carey, Vince Gill, and others on various live and recorded performances.

Music critic Dave Marsh, a close friend of Moore and the editor and co-writer of Moore's book, wrote about Moore in 2002 calling Moore "The Greatest Living Soul Singer."  In 2006, Moore received a MOBO (Music of Black Origin) lifetime achievement award in the UK.

Sam & Dave years

Sam Moore and Dave Prater were both experienced gospel music singers, having performed individually with groups the Sensational Hummingbirds and the Melionaires. They met in The King of Hearts Club in Miami in 1961, where they were discovered by regional producer Henry Stone who signed them to Roulette Records. After modest success at Roulette, they were signed by Jerry Wexler to Atlantic Records in 1964, then being "loaned" out to Stax Records to produce, record and release their records.
 
The duo's November 1965 single, "You Don't Know Like I Know", started a series of ten straight top twenty Billboard R&B hits that included "Hold On! I'm Comin'" (1966), "You Got Me Hummin' (1966), "When Something Is Wrong with My Baby" (1967), "Soul Man" (1967), and "I Thank You" (1968). Most of their hits were penned by Isaac Hayes and David Porter. In most of the recordings they were also backed by Hayes on piano with Booker T and the MGs and The Memphis Horns. The ending of their association with the Stax record label and their frequently volatile relationship contributed to their first break-up in 1970.

Sam & Dave performed throughout most of the 1970s until 1981, and enjoyed a brief resurgence in popularity due to the Blues Brothers's 1979 recording of "Soul Man". Their last performance together was on December 31, 1981, at the Old Waldorf in San Francisco. On April 9, 1988, Prater died in a car crash in Sycamore, Georgia.

Solo career
Moore began his solo career after breaking up with Prater in June 1970. He formed a new act called "Sam's Soul Together 1970 Review," which featured singer Brenda Jo Harris and a 16-piece orchestra. Moore released three singles on Atlantic Records between 1970 and 1971. These singles, along with other recordings made during that period, were to be released on an album produced by King Curtis. However in August 1971, King Curtis was murdered, and the album was shelved. Moore reunited with Prater in August 1971 and the two performed and recorded together over the next decade.

Moore toured with other soul artists including Wilson Pickett in Europe in the spring of 1982; he married his wife Joyce McRae in Europe. She helped Moore overcome a lengthy battle with drug addiction during this period of time which the couple later discussed in detail in Moore's book Sam & Dave - An Oral History, co-written with Dave Marsh and published in 1997. Moore not only went public with his addiction in 1983, but also became a strong anti-drug advocate and worked as a volunteer for anti-drug programs. McRae also became and is presently his business manager, and has worked together with Sam to advocate for artist's rights, royalties and pension payments.

Moore later claimed it was difficult for him to find steady performing work during much of the 1980s, because bookers wanted "Sam & Dave" and Moore wanted to be a solo artist. Additionally, Prater hired Sam Daniels in 1982 to perform the "Sam" part for the Sam & Dave act and thus, according to Moore, limited his opportunities to play as a solo artist. Moore pursued Prater legally to stop performing using his name, and was successful in getting an injunction against them performing in a few individual cities and counties. However, there is no national law prohibiting bands from disclosing whether they were original performers or not. Moore formed an organization "Artists and Others Against Imposters" and testified before Congress on the topic in 1989.

In 1984, Moore performed on the Don Henley album, Building the Perfect Beast on a song called "You Must Not Be Drinkin' Enough". In 1986, Moore re-recorded "Soul Man" with Lou Reed for the film of the same name. The song reached No. 30 on the UK Singles Chart. In April 1988, Moore joined the Elwood Blues Revue which featured Dan Aykroyd and The Blues Brothers Band.

Moore appeared with Junior Walker in the 1988 film Tapeheads, which featured Moore and Walker as the legendary soul duo "The Swanky Modes". Sam appeared on Late Night with David Letterman with Junior Walker later that year and performed the song "Ordinary Man" from the film. Their pairing was notable, as it was one of the few instances where performers from the Motown & Stax camps performed or recorded together.

1990-2000
In 1990, Moore toured in Europe with Booker T. & The MG's, Carla Thomas, and Eddie Floyd. One of these performances from the Monaco Soul Festival, was captured on film and broadcast in France. In 1991, Moore recorded several songs on Red, Hot & Blues with Republican Party official and avid bluesman, Lee Atwater. Moore also was given a Pioneer Award by the Rhythm & Blues Foundation in 1991 to acknowledge his lifetime contributions.

Moore and Prater (posthumously) were inducted into the Rock & Roll Hall of Fame on January 15, 1992, and Moore brought Hayes and Porter onstage with him at the ceremony to recognize his former songwriting and producing partners' contributions.  He also brought David Prater, Jr. (Dave's eldest son) to the ceremony to acknowledge his former singing partner. Shortly after the induction, Moore announced plans to record a solo LP, featuring duets with Bruce Springsteen, Phil Collins and others. In 1992, Moore recorded several songs with Springsteen for his Human Touch album. Moore also had a hit in 1994 with the Conway Twitty duet "Rainy Night In Georgia".

Moore continued to tour through the 1990s. He released "I'm a Dole Man" in 1996, with the "Soul Man" lyrics rewritten, for presidential candidate Bob Dole to play at voter rallies. The owners of the publishing rights to "Soul Man"'' did not agree with the claim that it was fair use of the song as a parody, and forced the campaign to stop using it.

In 1998, Moore appeared in the movie Blues Brothers 2000 playing the role of the Reverend Morris, fulfilling a childhood dream of being a preacher, and sang "John the Revelator". In 1999, "Soul Man" was inducted into the Grammy Hall of Fame to recognize timeless classics.

2000-2010

In 2002 Moore's solo album, recorded in 1971 but never released, finally hit the record stores. Plenty Good Lovin′, produced by King Curtis and featuring Aretha Franklin on piano, garnered a four-star review from USA Today.

In 2002, Moore starred in the D. A. Pennebaker-directed documentary Only the Strong Survive (Miramax). The film was a selection of both the Cannes and Sundance Film Festivals in 2002. In the film Moore chronicles his previous drug use.

In 2003, the Stax Museum opened in Memphis and Sam & Dave are featured prominently in the film made for the museum, Soulsville, and are honored with a permanent wall display and video display.

In December 2004, Rolling Stone magazine named "Soul Man" as one of the 500 greatest songs of all time, and Moore was a featured guest performer at Bruce Springsteen's 2003 Asbury Park Christmas shows. In the same year, Moore was featured in an episode of the Legends Rock TV Show which was produced by Megabien Entertainment.

On August 29, 2006, Moore released his first solo album, Overnight Sensational which was produced by Randy Jackson and featuring Sting, Mariah Carey, Bruce Springsteen, Jon Bon Jovi, Fantasia, and 20 other guest stars (produced with and available on Rhino Records). The album received some positive critical reviews, most notably for the song "You Are So Beautiful", which featured Moore, Billy Preston and Eric Clapton that received a Grammy Award nomination.

In 2008, Moore sent a cease and desist letter to the Barack Obama campaign to stop the use of his material at rallies for Obama's presidential campaign. In January 2009, Moore performed with Sting and Elvis Costello at the Creative Coalition's Presidential Inaugural Ball for Barack Obama. In December 2008, Sam & Dave: The Original Soul Men DVD was released in the US, featuring video performances of Sam & Dave from 1966 to 1980.

In February 2009, Moore filed suit against Bob and Harvey Weinstein, the producers of Soul Men, a comedy starring Bernie Mac claiming the film was based on the careers of Sam & Dave.

At the Rock & Roll Hall of Fame's 25th anniversary concert held at Madison Square Garden on October 29 and 30, 2009, Hall of Fame inductee (1992) Sam Moore performed the Sam & Dave hits "Soul Man" and "Hold On, I'm Comin'" with Bruce Springsteen & the E Street Band.

2010-2020

On November 22, 2013, Moore performed in Nashville's Bridgestone Arena, at the tribute concert for George Jones.

On April 4, 2014, Sam Moore released They Killed a King, a tribute song to Dr. Martin Luther King Jr. (1929-1968). Moore re-recorded the song January 17–18, 2014 at the Royal Studios in Memphis together with Michael Toles, Charles Hodges, Leroy Hodges, Steve Potts, Mark Plati, and Lawrence "Boo" Mitchell. The song was arranged by Lester Snell and produced by Mark Plati and Firmin Michiels. It was written (Lyrics and Music) in May 1968 by singer-songwriters Bobbejaan Schoepen (Belgium) and Jimmy James Ross (aka Mel Turner, born in Trinidad-Tobago). After four decades the song was rediscovered.

On 19 January 2017, Moore sang a rendition of "America the Beautiful" at incoming President Donald Trump's inaugural concert in Washington. Before his performance, Moore stated that he was "honored" to be a part of the ceremony and would not give in to pressure from left-wing activists to cancel his performance.

On 1 September 2017, age 81, Moore performed live at the Royal Albert Hall BBC Proms with Jools Holland and his Rhythm & Blues Orchestra in a tribute concert to 50 years of Stax Records synonymous with Southern Soul music.

On 26 January 2018, Moore performed "Soul Man" live along with Michael McDonald at the NAMM show in Anaheim, California on the Yamaha Grand Stage.

2021-present

In 2022, Moore joined Bruce Springsteen on his soul cover album for two songs, "Soul Days" and "I Forgot to Be Your Lover."

Discography

Studio albums

Holiday albums

Singles

Featured singles

Music videos

References

External links
 Official web site
 Sam Moore Interview NAMM Oral History Library (2022)
 Joyce Moore Interview NAMM Oral History Library (2022)

1935 births
American tenors
Living people
Musicians from Miami
Singers from Florida
Songwriters from Florida
American rhythm and blues singers
American soul musicians
American male songwriters